La Unión de los Tres Ejércitos or just La Unión is a village in the municipality of Clavijo, in the province and autonomous community of La Rioja, Spain. As of 2018 had a population of 185 people.

References

Populated places in La Rioja (Spain)